Kevin Sullivan (born November 5, 1959) is a Pulitzer Prize-winning American journalist, best-selling author and senior correspondent at The Washington Post.

Sullivan was a Post foreign correspondent for 14 years, working with his wife, Washington Post journalist Mary Jordan, as the newspaper's co-bureau chiefs in Tokyo, Mexico City and London.  Sullivan is well known for parachuting into faraway places, from Congo to Burma to Baghdad. He went to Afghanistan after the September 11, 2001 terrorist attacks and to Saudi Arabia when King Abdullah died, and again after Jamal Khashoggi was murdered. He has also served as the Post's chief foreign correspondent, deputy foreign editor, and Sunday and Features Editor.

Sullivan and Jordan have written three books together. Their most recent, “Trump on Trial” chronicled the Trump impeachment, and  Hope: A Memoir of Survival in Cleveland (with Amanda Berry and Gina DeJesus) was a No. 1 New York Times bestseller.

Sullivan is a frequent commentator on television and radio. He and Jordan have also been featured authors at the Library of Congress National Book Festival in Washington, D.C.

Early life and career
Sullivan was raised in Brunswick, Maine and graduated from the University of New Hampshire in 1981. After working for The Providence Journal in Rhode Island and the Gloucester Daily Times in Massachusetts, Sullivan joined the Post in 1991. At the Post, Sullivan has reported on six continents from more than 75 countries, including Afghanistan, Pakistan, Iraq, Cuba, Burma, Democratic Republic of the Congo, Sierra Leone and Haiti.

Sullivan spent a year studying Japanese language and East Asian affairs at Georgetown University in 1994–95, and he studied Spanish and Latin American affairs as a John S. Knight Fellow at Stanford University from 1999 to 2000.

Career recognition and awards
Sullivan and Jordan won the 2003 Pulitzer Prize for International Reporting for a series of stories about the Mexican criminal justice system. They were also finalists for the 2009 Pulitzer Prize for International Reporting, along with four Post photographers, for a series of stories on difficulties facing women around the world. The Pulitzer citation credited the series for "its sensitive examination of how females in the developing world are often oppressed from birth to death, a reporting project marked by indelible portraits of women and girls and enhanced by multimedia presentations."

Sullivan was also part of a Post team that was a finalist for the 2019 Pulitzer Prize for Public Service. Reporting from Saudi Arabia, Sullivan contributed to what the Pulitzer board called the Post's “commanding and courageous” coverage of the October 2018 murder of Saudi-born journalist Jamal Khashoggi.

Sullivan and Jordan, with Post colleague Keith Richburg, also won the 1998 George Polk Award for their reporting on the 1997 Asian Financial Crisis. Sullivan and Jordan have also won several other journalism awards, including those from the Overseas Press Club of America and the Society of Professional Journalists.

Sullivan and Jordan are the authors of the critically acclaimed “Trump on Trial: The Investigation, Impeachment, Acquittal and Aftermath,” published by Scribner in August 2020. The book, with reporting contributions from Washington Post colleagues, was given a “starred” review by Kirkus, which said it “sets a standard for political storytelling with impeccable research and lively writing.” It was reviewed on the cover of the New York Times Book Review.

Sullivan and Jordan also wrote The Prison Angel: Mother Antonia's Journey from Beverly Hills to a Life of Service in a Mexican Jail . The book was given the Christopher Award in 2006.

They were also the authors—together with Amanda Berry and Gina DeJesus, two of the women kidnapped and held for nearly a decade by Ariel Castro in Cleveland—of Hope: A Memoir of Survival in Cleveland, published by Viking in April 2015. The book reached the no. 1 position on The New York Times bestseller list on May 17, 2015.

Sullivan also contributed a chapter to Trump Revealed: An American Journey of Ambition, Ego, Money, and Power, a Washington Post biography of then-candidate Donald Trump published by Scribner in 2016.

Sullivan and Jordan contributed a chapter to Nine Irish Lives: The Thinkers, Fighters and Artists Who Helped Build America, edited by Mark Bailey and published by Algonquin Books in 2018.

Works

Bibliography 
Mary Jordan; Kevin Sullivan (5 May 2005). The Prison Angel: Mother Antonia's Journey from Beverly Hills to a Life of Service in a Mexican Jail. Penguin Press. 
Amanda Berry; Gina DeJesus; Mary Jordan; Kevin Sullivan (27 April 2015). Hope: A Memoir of Survival in Cleveland. Viking Press. 
Kevin Sullivan; Mary Jordan (25 August 2020). Trump on Trial: The Investigation, Impeachment, Acquittal and Aftermath. Scribner. .

Selected works from 2003 Pulitzer Prize-winning stories
In Mexico Hinterland, Life Beyond the Law
Torture, A Ghost in Mexico's Closet
Disparate Justice Imprisons Mexico's Poor
Kidnapping is Growth Industry in Mexico

Selected works from 2009 Pulitzer Prize-finalist series on the difficulties facing women
A Mother's Final Look at Life
In Sierra Leone, Every Pregnancy Is a 'Chance of Dying'
Africa's Last and Leas
In Africa, One Family's Struggle With the Global Food Crisis

Selected works from 2019 Pulitzer Prize-finalist series on the Jamal Khashoggi murder
Crown Prince Mohammed bin Salman is ‘chief of the tribe’ in a cowed House of Saud

Other selected works
The troubled and volatile life of Orlando mass murderer Omar Mateen
Police call him an ISIS recruiter. He says he's just an outspoken preacher.
Life in the "Islamic State"
The Americans Are Coming!
A rare look inside a Saudi prison that showers terrorists with perks
Flogging case in Saudi Arabia is just one sign of a new crackdown on rights activists
18 stories from Syrian Exodus
A Body and Spirit Broken by the Taliban
A Hymn to Yesterday: Paul McCartney Premieres His Choral Work, an Elegy for Linda
Saudi Arabia struggles to employ its most-educated women
Two years after Libya's revolution, government struggles to control hundreds of armed militias
In Iraq, scenes of hope and fear seven months after U.S. troops’ departure
Nine portraits of Iraq without America
Novel Faiths Find Followers Among Russia's Disillusioned
S. Korea's Middle Class Hides Its Despair 
Death of 3 Salesmen - Partners in Suicide
The un-Celebrity President
Lulu’s Choice
Fear, Hope and Deportations
Voices from Standing Rock
‘Evil, evil, evil as can be’: Emotional testimony as Dylann Roof trial begins
Fidel Castro, revolutionary leader who remade Cuba as a socialist state, dies at 90
For a President Trump, global real estate deals present unprecedented gray areas

Appearances and interviews
Shoulder to Shoulder: The Art and Chaos of Collaboration (Poynter Institute, 2005)
The Cleveland kidnapping: 'He took everything away' (Washington Post TV, 2015)
Hope: Survival in Cleveland: 2015 National Book Festival (Library of Congress, 2015)

References

1959 births
Living people
The Washington Post people
Pulitzer Prize for International Reporting winners
Writers from Brunswick, Maine
University of New Hampshire alumni